Hemlock Grove is an American supernatural drama series developed by Brian McGreevy and Lee Shipman, based on McGreevy's novel of the same name. The first season premiered exclusively via Netflix's web streaming service on April 19, 2013. The second season premiered on July 11, 2014. The third and final 10-episode season premiered on October 23, 2015.

Series overview

Episodes

Season 1 (2013)

Season 2 (2014)

Season 3 (2015)

References

External links

Hemlock Grove